Kathrin Vogler (born 29 September 1963) is a German politician. Born in München, Bavaria, she represents The Left. Kathrin Vogler has served as a member of the Bundestag from the state of North Rhine-Westphalia since 2009.

Life 
She became member of the bundestag after the 2009 German federal election. She is a member of the Foreign Affairs Committee.

References

External links 

  
 Bundestag biography 

1963 births
Living people
Members of the Bundestag for North Rhine-Westphalia
Female members of the Bundestag
21st-century German women politicians
Members of the Bundestag 2021–2025
Members of the Bundestag 2017–2021
Members of the Bundestag 2013–2017
Members of the Bundestag 2009–2013
Members of the Bundestag for The Left